In mathematics, the Besov space (named after Oleg Vladimirovich Besov)  is a complete quasinormed space which is a Banach space when .  These spaces, as well as the similarly defined Triebel–Lizorkin spaces, serve to generalize more elementary function spaces such as Sobolev spaces and are effective at measuring regularity properties of functions.

Definition

Several equivalent definitions exist. One of them is given below.

Let

and define the modulus of continuity by

The Besov space  contains all functions  such that

Norm
The Besov space  is equipped with the norm

The Besov spaces  coincide with the more classical Sobolev spaces .

References
 
 
 DeVore, R. and Lorentz, G. "Constructive Approximation", 1993.
 DeVore, R., Kyriazis, G. and Wang, P. "Multiscale characterizations of Besov spaces on bounded domains", Journal of Approximation Theory 93, 273-292 (1998).
 Leoni, Giovanni (2017). A First Course in Sobolev Spaces: Second Edition. Graduate Studies in Mathematics. 181. American Mathematical Society. pp. 734. 

Banach spaces
Function spaces